Saccharoturris centrodes is an extinct species of sea snail, a marine gastropod mollusk in the family Mangeliidae.

Description
The length of the shell attains 4.8 mm, its diameter 1.6 mm.

Distribution
This extinct marine species was found in Miocene strata off the Chipola River, Calhoun County, Florida, USA.

References

External links
 Worldiwde Mollusc Species Data Base: Saccharoturris centrodes

centrodes
Gastropods described in 1947